Hummelfeld is a municipality in the district  of Rendsburg-Eckernförde, in Schleswig-Holstein, Germany.

Hummelfeld is south of the municipality of Güby or Fleckeby, but north of Ascheffel, Hütten and Osterby.

References

Municipalities in Schleswig-Holstein
Rendsburg-Eckernförde